Janet Gray Hayes (July 12, 1926 – April 21, 2014) was the 60th mayor of San Jose, California, elected to two consecutive, four-year terms from 1975 to 1983. She was both the first woman to be elected mayor San Jose, and the first woman elected mayor of a major U.S. city with a population of more than 500,000 people.

Born in Rushville, Indiana, Hayes went to University of Chicago and then received her bachelor's degree from Indiana University. In 1956, Hayes and her husband moved to San Jose, California where her husband practiced medicine.

Hayes was elected to the San Jose City Council in 1971 In 1973, she was voted by the city council to serve as the city's vice mayor, becoming the first woman to hold that position. In 1974, she was elected mayor of the city. She was reelected in 1978. She was a Democrat and campaigned as an environmentalist and wanted to fight Urban sprawl in San Jose.

She died of a stroke on April 26, 2014 in Saratoga, California.

References

Women mayors of places in California
1926 births
2014 deaths
People from Rushville, Indiana
University of Chicago alumni
Indiana University alumni
California Democrats
San Jose City Council members
Mayors of San Jose, California
Women city councillors in California
21st-century American women